Reza Attaran (Persian: رضا عطاران, born May 10, 1968) is an Iranian actor, director, screenwriter and singer. He has received various accolades, including three Crystal Cymorgh, five Hafez Awards, an Iran Cinema Celebration Award and three Iran's Film Critics and Writers Association Awards.

Early life 
Attaran was born in Mashhad on May 10, 1968. He has two older sisters and a younger brother and is the third child in the family. Attaran is originally from Kakhkand his mother died in an earthquake in Kakhk.

Filmography

Film

Television

Web

Awards and nominations

References

External links

 

1968 births
Living people
Iranian comedians
Iranian screenwriters
Iranian film directors
Iranian male film actors
Iranian television directors
Iranian male television actors
Crystal Simorgh for Best Actor winners